Konchem Koththaga is a 2008 Telugu film directed, written by Raju Rajendra Prasad. Venkat plays the lead role while Ali, Tulip Joshi, Ashish Vidyarthi and Johnny Lever play other roles. The film released to positive reviews.

Cast
Venkat as Venkat
Ali as Thief
Tulip Joshi
Banerjee as Police Officer
Ashish Vidyarthi as Ashish Chebrolu, House owner
Lata Sabharwal as Seema Bheoroll, Ashish's wife
 Johnny Lever as Thief

Production 
The film was planned to be made as a bilingual in Telugu and Hindi with Johnny Lever playing Ali's role in Hindi. The first half of the film has no dialogues and the second half has no songs.

References

2008 films
2000s Telugu-language films